The San Francisco Police Department Park Station bombing occurred on February 16, 1970, when a pipe bomb filled with shrapnel detonated on the ledge of a window at the San Francisco Police Department's Upper Haight Park substation. Brian V. McDonnell, a police sergeant, was fatally wounded in its blast. Robert Fogarty, another police officer, was severely wounded in his face and legs and was partially blinded. In addition, eight other police officers were wounded.

According to the San Francisco Chronicle, "Investigators in the early '70s said the bombing likely was the work of the Weather Underground, and not the Black Liberation Army, which was implicated in the Ingleside attack."

Aftermath
An investigation was reopened in 1999. A San Francisco grand jury looked into the incident, but the results were not immediately made public. Secret federal grand juries were convened in 2001 and again in 2009 to re-open the Park Precinct cold case in an attempt to again tie WUO members to the deadly bombing. Ultimately, it was concluded that members of the Black Liberation Army, whom WUO members affiliated with while underground, were responsible for not only this action but also the bombing of another police precinct in San Francisco as well as bombing the Catholic Church funeral services of the police officer killed in the Park Precinct bombing in the early summer of 1970.

The case was unsolved as of 2007.

See also
Crime in San Francisco
List of unsolved murders
Terrorism in the United States

References 

1970 in San Francisco
1970 murders in the United States
Attacks on police stations in the 1970s
Crimes against police officers in the United States
Crimes in San Francisco
Explosions in 1970
February 1970 events in the United States
Building bombings in the United States
San Francisco Police Department
Unsolved murders in the United States
Weather Underground
Black Liberation Army